Mynydd Marian is a Site of Special Scientific Interest in Conwy, Wales. It is also a hill reaching a height of 208 metres (682 feet), with a trig point, and views to Snowdonia. It has high limestone cliffs which are popular with rock climbers. The village of Llysfaen lies on its southern slopes. Its elevation is 208.0 m (682 ft), there is a settlement with the same name, in 2018 it had an estimated population of 1122.

At the top of the hill, there is a house known as the Telegraph House, which was built in 1841. It was a part of a signaling stations chain that sent semaphore messages.

See also
List of Sites of Special Scientific Interest in Clwyd

References

Sites of Special Scientific Interest in Clwyd
Villages in Conwy County Borough